Christmas Full of Grace (Portuguese: Um Natal Cheio de Graça) is a 2022 Brazilian Christmas romantic comedy film directed by Pedro Antonio and written by Carolina García and Fil Braz. It stars Sérgio Malheiros, Gessica Kayane and Vera Fischer. It premiered on November 30, 2022 on Netflix.

Plot 
Carlinhos (Sérgio Malheiros) planned to propose to his girlfriend, on the eve of his family's Christmas dinner, where the two would go together to celebrate with Carlinhos' grandmother. It is then that he discovers that his girlfriend has cheated on him with another woman. Rushing out of the apartment they shared, he meets Graça (Gessica Kayane), a woman who gives him the idea of posing as a fake couple to cover up his girlfriend's betrayal. In this desperate measure, in order not to upset the family, on one of the most important dates of the year, Carlinhos accepts Graça's idea, but soon discovers that it was a bad strategy. Party girl and frank, Graça begins to disturb the Christmas dinner in the mansion of Lady Sofia (Vera Fischer), the matriarch of the family. Soon it is revealed that Graça lost her father, who was Papa Noel (Santa Claus). Since losing her father, Graça spends her Christmas with a different family each year, in hopes of not spending Christmas alone. Carlinhos and Graça start developing feelings towards each other, the more time they spend together. When going to a Christmas Festival, she runs into one of the families she spent Christmas with. After running away Carlinhos and Graça wind up making out, which leads them to sleep together. The next day, tired of living a lie, Graça decides to leave, but Dona Francisca convinces her to stay. Bebela (Carlinhos ex-girlfriend) shows up and Graça's secret is revealed to the family by Pedro Alfonso who is Carlinhos cousin. He calls Carlinhos a chump for being duped by his girlfriend. It is also revealed that Pedro Alfonso's girlfriend and Bebela had a secret affair and she's here so that they can finally be together. After telling Graça that he can no longer trust her, she gets angry for judging her so easily and leaves. He regrets saying what he said to Graça and tries everything in his will to get her back. Lady Sophia convinces Graça to go to the New Year's Eve party and there she and Carlinhos make up and share a kiss. shows

Cast 
The actors participating in this film are:

 Sérgio Malheiros as Carlinhos
 Gessica Kayane as Gracia
 Vera Fischer as Lady Sofia
 Leticia Isnard
 Monique Alfradique
 Leticia Isnard
 Heitor Martínez
 Diogo Defante
 Valéria Vitoriano
 Nando Cunha
 Gabriel Louchard
 Flávia Reis
 Marianna Armellini
 Cezar Maracujá
 Noemia Oliveira
 Valentina Vieira
 Victor Meyniel

Production 
Filming began in November 2021 and ended in early December of the same year. It was filmed entirely in Rio de Janeiro in the Leblon neighborhood, located in the South Zone

See also
 List of Christmas films

References

External links 
 
 

2022 films
2022 romantic comedy films
2022 LGBT-related films
Brazilian romantic comedy films
Brazilian LGBT-related films
2020s Christmas comedy films
2020s Portuguese-language films
Films set in Brazil
Films shot in Brazil
Films shot in Rio de Janeiro (city)
Films set in Rio de Janeiro (city)
Films about infidelity
Brazilian Christmas comedy films
Portuguese-language Netflix original films